Slaves of New York is a 1989 American comedy-drama Merchant Ivory Productions film. Directed by 
James Ivory and produced by Ismail Merchant, it stars Bernadette Peters, Adam Coleman Howard, Chris Sarandon, Mary Beth Hurt, Mercedes Ruehl, Madeleine Potter, and Steve Buscemi.

Based on the stories Slaves of New York by Tama Janowitz, the film follows the lives of struggling artists in New York City during the mid-1980s.

Plot
The story follows Eleanor, an aspiring hat designer, and a group of artists and models in the "downtown" New York City art world. Eleanor lives with her younger boyfriend Stash, an unknown artist, who is unfaithful and treats Eleanor with careless indifference. Eleanor expresses her feelings for Stash when she tells him that she was once attracted to him because he was dangerous. She stays with him despite the crumbling relationship because she has nowhere else to live—she is, in effect, a "slave."

When a clothing designer, Wilfredo, discovers her hat designs and offers to use them in a fashion show, Eleanor gains the self-respect—and money—to leave Stash.  There is an elaborate fashion show sequence.

While buying food for a celebratory party, she meets Jan and invites him to the party. After the party, Eleanor and her new friend talk, and then ride off into the morning sunrise.

Cast

 Bernadette Peters as Eleanor
 Chris Sarandon as Victor Okrent
 Mary Beth Hurt as Ginger Booth
 Madeleine Potter as Daria
 Adam Coleman Howard as Stash
 Nick Corri as Marley
 Charles McCaughan as Sherman
 John Harkins as Chuck Dade Dolger
 Mercedes Ruehl as Samantha
 Joe Leeway as Jonny Jalouse
 Anna Katarina as Mooshka
 Bruce Peter Young as Mikell
 Michael Schoeffling as Jan
 Steve Buscemi as Wilfredo

Production 
Tama Janowitz had written a script for Andy Warhol, based on the Eleanor and Stash stories in her 1986 collection of short stories, Slaves of New York. When Warhol died, Merchant Ivory bought that script.  The real graffiti artist from New York City named Stash, who is a friend of Janowitz, was the influence for the name of her lead character and can be seen as an extra in many of the party scenes.

The fashion show in the movie had costumes by designer Stephen Sprouse.

In discussing casting the role of Eleanor, James Ivory commented:  "...but out of 100 girls, there was not a single one with Miss Peters's originality. We wanted someone unusual and different but also ingenuous and not too knowing."
 
Slaves of New York was shot on location in New York City, in the Lower East Side, a downtown gallery and a club. Shooting started on April 4, 1988, with a 10-week shooting schedule. There was a "modest" budget—$5 million—that meant there were no lengthy rehearsals. There was one read-through before shooting began.

There are several cameos in this film: for example, Producer Ismail Merchant, lyricist Betty Comden and Adam Green, son of her writing partner, Adolph Green, and Tony Award-winning actress Tammy Grimes appear in party scenes.

Reception
Slaves of New York received mostly unfavorable reviews at the time of its release. Janet Maslin wrote that the film "...simply drifts from situation to situation" and is "never terribly involving".  Roger Ebert, who gave the movie a half-star rating, opened his review with the statement "I detest Slaves of New York so much that I distrust my own opinion."

According to Box Office Mojo, the film's domestic gross was $463,972. On Rotten Tomatoes, it holds a rating of 30% from 10 reviews.

Slaves of New York became a cult classic amongst the gay communities in the United States. It is notorious for a scene that features a drag act performing "Love Is Like an Itching in My Heart" by The Supremes while making their way down a street in full evening gowns.

Music list

Performed on screen
"Mother Dearest"Written and performed on screen by Joe Leeway
"Say Hi to Your Guy"Written and performed on screen by Johann Carlo and Michael Butler

Soundtrack album selections
"Some Guys Have All the Luck"Written by Jeff FortgangPerformed by Maxi Priest
"Tumblin' Down"Written by Ziggy Marley and Tyrone DowniePerformed by Ziggy Marley and the Melody Makers
"Admit It""Love Overlap"Written by Arto Lindsay and Peter SchererPerformed by Ambitious Lovers
"Buffalo Stance"Written by Neneh Cherry, Cameron McVey, Phillip Ramacon and Jamie MorganPerformed by Neneh Cherry
"Girlfriend"Written by Boy George, Vlad NaslasPerformed by Boy George
"Change Your Mind"Written by Camper Van BeethovenPerformed by Camper Van Beethoven
"Good Life"Written by Kevin Saunderson, Paris Grey and Ray HolmanPerformed by Inner City
"Fall in Love with Me"Written by Iggy Pop, David Bowie, Hunt B. Sales and  Tony SalesPerformed by Iggy Pop
"Tongue Dance"Written by Catherine Ringer and Frederic ChichinPerformed by Rita Les Mitsouko

Additional music
"Warrior"(from 9 1989)Written by Allan Dias, Lu Edmonds, John Lydon, John McGeoch and Bruce SmithPerformed by Public Image Ltd
"Am I Blue?"Written by Grant Clarke and Harry AkstPerformed by Billie Holiday
"Dad, I’m In Jail"(from What Up, Dog? 1988)Written by David Was and Don WasPerformed by Was (Not Was)
"The Grand Tour"(from The Grand Tour 1974)Written by Carmol Taylor, George Richey and Norris WilsonPerformed by George Jones
"Glück, das mir Verblieb"From Die tote Stadt by Erich Wolfgang KorngoldPerformed by Carol Neblett
"Love Is Like an Itching in My Heart"(from The Supremes A' Go-Go 1966)Written by Brian Holland, Lamont Dozier and Eddie HollandPerformed by The Supremes
"I Need a Man"(from Savage 1987) Written by Annie Lennox and Dave StewartPerformed by the Eurythmics
"O ruddier than the cherry"From Acis and Galatea by George Frideric HandelPerformed by John Ostendorf

Uncredited
"Opening title" by Richard Robbins (loosely based on "I'll Be Your Baby Tonight" by Bob Dylan), sung by Bernadette Peters with chorus
"Prélude" from Carmen by Georges Bizet
"Hallelujah Chorus" from Messiah by George Frideric Handel
"Kuroda-bushi" 黒田節

References

External links
 Merchant Ivory Production
 
 
 

1989 films
1989 comedy-drama films
American comedy-drama films
Films based on short fiction
Merchant Ivory Productions films
Films directed by James Ivory
Films about fashion designers
Films about fictional painters
1989 comedy films
1989 drama films
1980s English-language films
1980s American films
English-language comedy-drama films